The 2016 Open Sud de France was a tennis tournament played on indoor hard courts. It was the 29th edition of the Open Sud de France, and part of the ATP World Tour 250 Series of the 2016 ATP World Tour. It took place at the Arena Montpellier in Montpellier, France, from February 1 to February 7, 2016.

Points and prize money

Point distribution

Prize money

Singles main draw entrants

Seeds 

 Rankings were as of January 18, 2015.

Other entrants 
The following players received wildcards into the singles main draw:
  Marcos Baghdatis
  Julien Benneteau
  Quentin Halys

The following players received entry from the qualifying draw:
  Dustin Brown
  Kenny de Schepper
  Édouard Roger-Vasselin
  Elias Ymer

Withdrawals 
Before the tournament
  Ivan Dodig →replaced by  Luca Vanni
  Jerzy Janowicz →replaced by  Jan-Lennard Struff
  Andrey Kuznetsov →replaced by  Nikoloz Basilashvili
  Tommy Robredo →replaced by  Ruben Bemelmans

Doubles main draw entrants

Seeds 

 Rankings were as of January 18, 2016.

Other entrants 
The following pairs received wildcards into the doubles main draw:
  Paul-Henri Mathieu /  Vincent Millot
  Alexander Zverev /  Mischa Zverev

Withdrawals 
During the tournament
  Jonathan Erlich (lower body pain)

Champions

Singles 

  Richard Gasquet def.  Paul-Henri Mathieu 7–5, 6–4

Doubles 

  Mate Pavić /  Michael Venus def.  Alexander Zverev /  Mischa Zverev 7–5, 7–6(7–4)

References

External links 
 

O
 
Open